The 2019 BET Hip Hop Awards was a recognition ceremony held on TV on October 9, 2019 from the Atlanta's Cobb Energy Center. The nominations were announced on September 12, 2019. 

After notching four wins at the previous year's festivities, Cardi B lead with 10 nominations in 2019.

There was a three-way tie for second most nominations as DJ Khaled, Travis Scott and J. Cole each nabbed eight nominations. Despite his passing earlier the year, Nipsey Hussle received five nominations. As for newcomers, Megan Thee Stallion snagged five, while DaBaby garnered four.

Cyphers
 Cypher 1 - Kash Doll, IDK, Travis Thompson, Iman Shumpert & King Los
 Cypher 2 - Jess Hilarious, Chico Bean, Karlous Miller, Affion Crockett & Lil Duval

Winners and nominees

Best Hip Hop Video 
 Cardi B – "Money"
 21 Savage featuring J. Cole – "A Lot"
 City Girls featuring Cardi B – "Twerk"
 DaBaby – "Suge"
 Meek Mill featuring Drake – "Going Bad"
 Travis Scott featuring Drake – "Sicko Mode"

Best Collabo, Duo or Group 
 Lil Nas X featuring Billy Ray Cyrus – "Old Town Road (Remix)"
 21 Savage featuring J. Cole – "A Lot"
 Cardi B and Bruno Mars – "Please Me"
 DJ Khaled featuring Nipsey Hussle and John Legend – "Higher"
 Lil Baby and Gunna – "Drip Too Hard"
 Travis Scott featuring Drake – "Sicko Mode"

Hot Ticket Performer 
 Megan Thee Stallion
 Cardi B
 DaBaby
 Drake
 The Carters
 Travis Scott

Lyricist of the Year 
 J. Cole
 2 Chainz
 Cordae
 Drake
 Meek Mill
 Nipsey Hussle

Video Director of the Year  
 Travis Scott
 Benny Boom
 Bruno Mars and Florent Dechard
 Dave Meyers
 Eif Rivera

DJ of the Year 
 Mustard
 Chase B
 DJ Drama
 DJ Envy
 DJ Esco
 DJ Khaled

Producer of the Year 
 DJ Khaled
 London On Da Track
 Metro Boomin
 Mustard
 Swizz Beatz
 Tay Keith

MVP of the Year 
 Nipsey Hussle
 Cardi B
 DJ Khaled
 Drake
 J. Cole
 Megan Thee Stallion

Single of the Year 
Only the producer of the track nominated in this category.
 "Old Town Road (Remix)" – Produced by YoungKio (Lil Nas X featuring Billy Ray Cyrus)
 "Act Up" – Produced by EarlThePearll (City Girls)
 "Big Ole Freak" – Produced by LilJuMadeDaBeat (Megan Thee Stallion)
 "Money" – Produced by J. White Did It (Cardi B)
 "Sicko Mode" – Produced by Rogét Chahayed, Cubeatz, OZ, Hit-Boy and Tay Keith (Travis Scott featuring Drake)
 "Suge" – Produced by JetsonMade and Pooh Beatz (DaBaby)

Album of the Year 
 Travis Scott – Astroworld
 Meek Mill – Championships
 Lizzo – Cuz I Love You
 DJ Khaled – Father of Asahd
 Tyler, the Creator – Igor
 Dreamville – Revenge of the Dreamers 3

Best New Hip Hop Artist 
 DaBaby
 Blueface
 Lil Nas X
 Megan Thee Stallion
 Roddy Ricch
 Cordae

Hustler of the Year 
 JAY-Z
 Cardi B
 DJ Khaled
 Nipsey Hussle
 Rick Ross
 Travis Scott

Made-You-Look Award (Best Hip Hop Style)
 Cardi B
 DJ Khaled
 French Montana
 Meek Mill
 Rick Ross
 Travis Scott

Best Mixtape 
 Megan Thee Stallion – Fever
 Jack Harlow – Loose
 Kevin Gates – Luca Brasi 3
 Roddy Ricch – Feed Tha Streets II
 Wiz Khalifa and Curren$y – 2009
 YBN Almighty Jay, Cordae and YBN Nahmir – YBN: The Mixtape

Sweet 16: Best Featured Verse 
 J. Cole – "A Lot" (21 Savage featuring J. Cole)
 21 Savage – "Wish Wish" (DJ Khaled featuring Cardi B and 21 Savage)
 Cardi B – "Clout" (Offset featuring Cardi B)
 Cardi B – "Twerk" (City Girls featuring Cardi B)
 Rick Ross – "Money in the Grave" (Drake featuring Rick Ross)
 Rick Ross – "What's Free" (Meek Mill featuring JAY-Z and Rick Ross)

Impact Track 
 J. Cole – "Middle Child"
 21 Savage featuring J. Cole – "A Lot"
 DJ Khaled featuring Nipsey Hussle and John Legend – "Higher"
 Kap G – "A Day Without a Mexican"
 Lizzo featuring Missy Elliott – "Tempo"
 YoungBoy Never Broke Again featuring Quando Rondo and Kevin Gates – "I Am Who They Say I Am"

Best International Flow
 Sarkodie (Ghana)
 Falz (Nigeria)
 Ghetts (UK)
 Kalash (France)
 Little Simz (UK)
 Nasty C (South Africa)
 Tory Lanez (Canada)

Best Hip-Hop Online Site/App
 Complex
 All Hip-Hop
 HotNewHipHop
 The Shade Room
 WorldStar
 XXL

I Am Hip Hop Icon
Lil’ Kim

References

BET Hip Hop Awards